Philippe Rommens (20 August 1997) is a Belgian professional footballer who plays for Dutch Eredivisie club Go Ahead Eagles as a midfielder.

Career

PSV
Rommens is a youth exponent from PSV Eindhoven, who he joined in 2006 together with his brother, Olivier. Before, they had both started out at local club KFC Ranst, and moved to Lierse SK, where they played for four year before starting at the youth academy of PSV. 

Rommens made his professional debut as Jong PSV player in the second tier on 19 September 2014 against Sparta Rotterdam in a 0–2 home defeat. Rommens scored his first goal in professional football on 8 August 2016 in a home game with Jong PSV against Den Bosch – which ended in a 5–4 win. He scored the fourth goal for his team. Rommens played an official match against his brother Olivier for the first time on 9 September, where he with Jong PSV played in the Eerste Divisie again NAC Breda in a 1–1 draw.

TOP Oss
Rommens played for PSV for twelve years, including four seasons – mainly as a substitute – for Jong PSV. A debut in the first team was, however, not in the cards. The club let him leave for TOP Oss on a free transfer in August 2018. There, he almost immediately became a starter. TOP Oss reunited him with his brother Olivier in January 2019. 

On 31 July, it was announced that Rommens had suffered an injury which required surgery. He was subsequently sidelined for 3–4 months. He returned to the pitch on 10 November in a 3–0 loss to Excelsior coming on as a substitute in the 56th minute for Kyvon Leidsman.

Go Ahead Eagles
On 22 May 2021, it was announced that Rommens had signed a two-year contract with Go Ahead Eagles, with an option for an additional season. This meant, that he would join the recently promoted Eredivisie club for the 2021–22 season. He made his debut on 13 August, opening day in the domestic league, in a 1–0 home loss to SC Heerenveen.

Personal
His brother is football player Olivier Rommens, currently playing for TOP Oss.

Career statistics

Club

References

External links

 

1997 births
Living people
Belgian footballers
Lierse S.K. players
Jong PSV players
PSV Eindhoven players
TOP Oss players
Go Ahead Eagles players
Eerste Divisie players
Belgian expatriates in the Netherlands
Expatriate footballers in the Netherlands
Belgium youth international footballers
Association football midfielders